The Tower of Roglianu or Tower of Parrochia is a Genoese tower located in the commune of Rogliano in the Cap Corse region of the Corsica.

It was built in the 15th century and is now privately owned. In 1935 it was listed as one of the official historical monuments of France.

See also
List of Genoese towers in Corsica

Notes and references

Towers in Corsica
Monuments historiques of Corsica